Religion in the Faroe Islands consists largely of the Lutheran Church of the Faroe Islands, but also includes smaller Protestant groups such as the Open Brethren, as well as a few Catholics and adherents of non-Trinitarian religions, such as the Jehovah's Witnesses.

The Church of the Faroe Islands is the established religion since it became independent in 2007; previously the Church of Denmark held that role.

The Faroe Islands, located between Scotland and Iceland, are partly ruled by Denmark, and as such the people long practiced the same religion as the Danes although religious observance is nowadays more widespread and intense among the Faroese.

History

The Færeyinga saga is often cited with respect to the early spread of Christendom in the islands. The saga states that the king of Norway told Sigmund to go by ship to the Faroe Islands with orders from the King. Sigmund's orders were clear: he was supposed to make the 18 small islands Christian, which is what he did, according to the saga. This event is believed to have taken place around 1000, but the Faroese did not establish an organised congregation of the Catholic Church before around 1100, so there do appear to be some inconsistencies in the saga.

Originally belonging to Norway, Faroe fell under the jurisdiction of Denmark in 1523. The last Catholic Bishop of the Faroe Islands was Ámundur Ólavsson (Amund); he was replaced by the first Lutheran bishop, Jens Gregersøn Riber, in 1540.

Demographics
According to the 2011 Census, there were 33,018 Christians (95.44%), 23 Muslims (0.07%), 7 Hindus (0.02%), 66 Buddhists (0.19%), 12 Jews (0.03%), 13 Baháʼís (0.04%), 3 Sikhs (0.01%), 149 Others (0.43%), 85 with more than one belief (0.25%) and 1,397 with no religion (4.04%).

The Catholic Church has around 270 adherents, representing 0.8% from Faroe population. There are also small groups of Seventh-day Adventists, Jehovah's Witnesses, Ahmadi Muslims and followers of the Baháʼí Faith in the country.

See also 
Church of the Faroe Islands (Fólkakirkjan)
Catholic Church in the Faroe Islands

References